The Caretaker is the fourth studio album by American musician Nandi Rose Plunkett, under her stage name Half Waif. It was released on March 27, 2020, under Anti-.

The first single from the album, "Ordinary Talk" was released on January 28, 2020.

Critical reception

The Caretaker was met with generally favorable reviews from critics. At Metacritic, which assigns a weighted average rating out of 100 to reviews from mainstream publications, this release received an average score of 79, based on 9 reviews.

Track listing

References

2020 albums
Anti- (record label) albums